Heliozela anna, the jamun leaf miner, is a moth of the family Heliozelidae. It was described by Thomas Bainbrigge Fletcher in 1920. It is found in India, including Bengal.

The larvae feed on Syzygium cumini. They mine the leaves of their host plant.

References

Moths described in 1920
Heliozelidae
Leaf miners
Moths of Asia